Promenesta capnocoma is a moth in the family Depressariidae. It was described by Edward Meyrick in 1931. It is found in Brazil.

The wingspan is about 14 mm.

References

Moths described in 1931
Promenesta
Taxa named by Edward Meyrick